Paralobesia is a genus of moths belonging to the subfamily Olethreutinae of the family Tortricidae. Paralobesia Obraztsov, 1953 is a genus of small moths in the family Tortricidae. Although Holarctic in distribution, the vast majority of the species are restricted to the Nearctic Region.

Species
Paralobesia aemulana (Heinrich, 1926)
Paralobesia alafusca Royals and Gilligan, 2019
Paralobesia albiterminana Royals and Dang, 2019
Paralobesia andereggiana (Herrich-Schäffer, 1851)
Paralobesia annetteae Royals and Gilligan, 2019
Paralobesia aruncana (Kearfott, 1907)
Paralobesia blandula (Heinrich, 1926)
Paralobesia crassa Royals and Gilligan, 2019
Paralobesia crispans Royals and Gilligan, 2019
Paralobesia cyclopiana (Heinrich, 1926)
Paralobesia cypripediana (Forbes, 1923)
Paralobesia dividuana Royals and Gilligan, 2019
Paralobesia exasperana (McDunnough, 1938)
Paralobesia glenni Royals and Gilligan, 2019
Paralobesia hodgesi Royals and Gilligan, 2019
Paralobesia kearfotti Royals and Gilligan, 2019
Paralobesia landryi Royals and Gilligan, 2019
Paralobesia liriodendrana (Kearfott, 1904)
Paralobesia maculana Royals and Gilligan, 2019
Paralobesia magnoliana (Kearfott, 1907)
Paralobesia marilynae Royals and Gilligan, 2018
Paralobesia monotropana (Heinrich, 1926)
Paralobesia monslata Royals and Gilligan, 2019
Paralobesia moritzi Royals and Gilligan, 2019
Paralobesia pallicircula Royals and Gilligan, 2019
Paralobesia pallida Royals and Gilligan, 2019
Paralobesia palliolana (McDunnough, 1938)
Paralobesia parsaura Royals and Gilligan, 2019
Paralobesia piceana (Freeman, 1941)
Paralobesia piperae Royals and Gilligan, 2019
Paralobesia rhoifructana (Kearfott, 1907)
Paralobesia ridingensi Royals and Gilligan, 2019
Paralobesia sambuci (Clarke, 1953)
Paralobesia slingerlandana (Kearfott, 1904)
Paralobesia spiraeifoliana (Heinrich, 1923)
Paralobesia tenuis Royals and Gilligan, 2019
Paralobesia vernoniana (Kearfott, 1907)
Paralobesia viteana (Clemens, 1860)
Paralobesia wontonana Royals and Gilligan, 2019
Paralobesia worthi Royals and Gilligan, 2019
Paralobesia wrighti Royals and Gilligan, 2019
Paralobesia yaracana (Kearfott, 1907)

See also
List of Tortricidae genera

References

External links
tortricidae.com

Olethreutini
Tortricidae genera